Mexico City Metro Line 4 is the fourth line of Mexico City Metro. The line color is aqua blue and it runs from north to south of the city crossing the city center by its easternmost area. In 2019 it had a total ridership of 29,013,032 passengers, making it the least used line on the system.

General information
It was built above the former Inguarán Avenue (now Congreso de la Unión) in viaduct solution, this makes it the only line without an underground section. With only ten stations, its short length is countervailed with its high connectivity, having transfer with other metro lines in six stations: Line 6 at Martín Carrera, Line 5 at Consulado, Line B at Morelos, Line 1 at Candelaria, Line 9 at Jamaica and Line 8 at Santa Anita. However, it is also the line with the fewest passengers in the entire system, having only 29,013,032 passengers throughout 2019.

The line is also characterized by its above-ground architecture, having all of its station facilities elevated or in massive buildings present in both sides of the street. A side effect of this is having long passageways with connecting lines, generally unused or empty sections in stations, closed passageways and other features, all due to its low ridership. Also, trains in Line 4 have been shortened from its original configuration of nine cars to only six.

History
The first stretch of Line 4 was inaugurated on 29 August 1981, from Martín Carrera station to Candelaria station. Line 4 was the first line to feature an elevated section, built over Avenida H. Congreso de la Unión. Lines 9, B and 12 would later also have elevated sections. The total cost of Line 4's first stage was 6,900 million pesos.

The second stage of the line was opened for service on 26 May 1982, with four new stations, going from Candelaria to Santa Anita.

Upon completion of the line, it had only two transfer stations: Candelaria with Line 1 and Consulado with Line 5. Transfer to Line 6 at Martín Carrera would open in 1986, to Line 9 at Jamaica in 1987, to Line 8 at Santa Anita in 1995 and to Line B at Morelos in 1999.

There were two plans to expand the line. Such plan never materialized.

In 1996, the Sistema de Transporte Colectivo (STC) on its master plan for Mexico City Metro considered building an expansion for Line 4; this time, it would be expanded northbound from Martín Carrera to Ecatepec in the State of Mexico. As with the 1985 plan, this extension was never built.

In 2018, the STC again presented a plan projected to 2030. In this document, there is an extension planned for Line 4 that would expand the line northward from Martín Carrera towards Tepexpan and southward from Santa Anita to the southern part of the Periférico.

Chronology 
29 August 1981: from Martín Carrera to Candelaria
26 May 1982: from Candelaria to Santa Anita

Rolling stock
Line 4 has had different types of rolling stock throughout the years.

Alstom MP-68: 1981–1985
Concarril NM-73: 1981–present
Concarril NM-79: 1981

Out of the 390 trains in the Mexico City Metro network, 12 are in service in Line 4, this is the fewest trains per line in the entire system.

Station list 

The stations from north to south: 
{| class="wikitable" rules="all"
|-
!rowspan="2" | No.
!rowspan="2" | Station
!rowspan="2" | Date opened
!rowspan="2" | Level
!colspan="2" | Distance (km)
!rowspan="2" | Connection
!rowspan="2" | Location
|-
!style="font-size: 65%;"|Betweenstations
!style="font-size: 65%;"|Total
|-
|style="background: #; color: white;"|01
|Martín Carrera
| rowspan="7" |August 29, 1981
|Ground-level, underground access.
|style="text-align:right;"|-
|style="text-align:right;"|0.0
|
  Line 6
 Martín Carrera
  Line 6: Martín Carrera station
 Routes: 33, 37
  Line 5: Martín Carrera stop
 Route: 5-A
|rowspan="4"|Gustavo A. Madero
|-
|style="background: #; color: white;"|02
|Talismán
| rowspan="5" |Elevated, overground access
|style="text-align:right;"|1.3
|style="text-align:right;"|1.3
|
 Route: 37
 Routes: 5-A (at distance), 15-C
|-
|style="background: #; color: white;"|03
|Bondojito
|style="text-align:right;"|1.1
|style="text-align:right;"|2.4
|
 Routes: 11-A, 12, 37
  Line 4: Av. Congreso de la Unión stop (east-west route; at distance)
 Routes: 5-A, 7-D (at distance)
|-
|style="background: #; color: white;"|04
|Consulado
|style="text-align:right;"|0.8
|style="text-align:right;"|3.2
|
  Line 5
  Line 5: Río Consulado station (at distance)
 Routes: 37, 200 (at distance)
 Route: 5-A
|-
|style="background: #; color: white;"|05
|Canal del Norte
|style="text-align:right;"|1.0
|style="text-align:right;"|4.2
|
 Route: 37
 Routes: 5-A, 10-D (at distance), 10-E (at distance)
|rowspan="5"|Venustiano Carranza
|-
|style="background: #; color: white;"|06
|Morelos 
|style="text-align:right;"|1.1
|style="text-align:right;"|5.3
|
  Line B
  Line 4: Morelos station (at distance)
 Routes: 18, 37
 Routes: 5-A, 10-E
|-
|style="background: #; color: white;"|07
|Candelaria-Palacio Legislativo
|Ground-level, underground access
|style="text-align:right;"|1.2
|style="text-align:right;"|6.4
|
  Line 1 (out of service)
  Line 4: Cecilio Robelo station (at distance)
 Route: 37 (also temporary Line1 service)
 Route: 5-A
|-
|style="background: #; color: white;"|08
|Fray Servando
| rowspan="3" |May 26, 1982
| rowspan="2" |Elevated, overground access
|style="text-align:right;"|0.8
|style="text-align:right;"|7.3
|
 Route: 37
 Routes: 5-A, 19-E, 19-F, 19-G, 19-H
|-
|style="background: #; color: white;"|09
|Jamaica 
|style="text-align:right;"|1.2
|style="text-align:right;"|8.4
|
  Line 9
  Line 2: Jamaica stop
 Route: 37
 Routes: 5-A, 9-C (at distance), 9-E (at distance), 14-A (at distance)
|-
|style="background: #; color: white;"|10
|Santa Anita
|Elevated, underground access
|style="text-align:right;"|0.9
|style="text-align:right;"|9.3
|
  Line 8
 Santa Anita (unused)
 Route: 37
 Routes: 5-A, 14-A
|Iztacalco
|}

Ridership
The following table shows each of Line 4's stations' total and average daily ridership during 2019.

See also 
 List of Mexico City Metro lines

Notes

References 

1981 establishments in Mexico
4
Railway lines opened in 1981